The 1994 South Africa rugby union tour of Britain and Ireland was a series of matches played in October and November 1994 in Britain and Ireland by South Africa national rugby union team. The Springboks played two Test matches on the thirteen match tour and won both.

Touring party

Coach: Kitch Christie
Assistant coach: Gysie Pienaar
Manager: Jannie Engelbrecht

Results 
Scores and results list South Africa's points tally first.

Test Matches

Test: Scotland

Test: Wales

References

1994 rugby union tours
1994
1994
1994
1994
1994–95 in European rugby union
1994–95 in Irish rugby union
1994–95 in Welsh rugby union
1994–95 in Scottish rugby union
1994 in South African rugby union